The People's Guardian Party  (hi:लोक रक्षक) of India was founded in January 2009, by Arun Bhatia. Bhatia is its Chairman and President.

Background
In 2004 Bhatia contested the parliamentary election as an independent candidate from Pune.

Ideology

The ideology of the People's Guardian Party is to:

 Give every honest Indian freedom from fear
 Eliminate mafia rule
 Drive change from Pune.

The party is registered with the Election Commission of India, New Delhi.

Support
In the 2004 election Bhatia received ~60,000 votes. He supported Durga Shakti Nagpal's action against the sand mafia.

See also

 List of political parties in India

References

Ideology

External links
 
 Election Commission of India

Political parties in India
Political parties established in 2009
2009 establishments in Maharashtra